This is a list of islands of Sri Lanka. There are number of islands around Sri Lanka. The most prominent islets are west of the Jaffna Peninsula in the Northern Province. These group of islands also had Dutch names during the Dutch colonial period but only a few of those names are still in use today.

The nation has a total area of 65,610 km2, with 64,740 km2 of land and 870 km2 of water. Its coastline is 1,340 km long. The main island of Sri Lanka has an area of 65,268 km2 – it's the twenty-fifth largest island of the world by area. Dozens of offshore islands account for the remaining 342 km2 area.

See also 
 List of islands

References 
 
 
 
 
 

Sri Lanka, List of islands of
 
Islands